Yitzhak Kahan (November 15, 1913 – April 24, 1985) was President of the Supreme Court of Israel from 1982 until 1983. He was the Chairman of the Commission of Inquiry into the Events at the Refugee Camps in Beirut also known as the Kahan Commission, which was established to investigate the Sabra and Shatila massacre.

Born in Brody, Galicia, Austria-Hungary, he was the brother of Rav Kalman Kahana, a former Knesset member. He studied law, administration, and economics at the University of Lviv before emigrating to Mandatory Palestine in 1935. 

In 1950, he was appointed a magistrate judge in Haifa,  and he became a district judge in, 1953. On October 7, 1970, Kahan was appointed to the Supreme Court of Israel.

On March 26, 1981, he was appointed President of the Supreme Court of Israel.

References
 

1913 births
1985 deaths
People from Brody
Ukrainian Jews
20th-century Israeli judges
Chief justices of the Supreme Court of Israel
Polish emigrants to Mandatory Palestine